Muchhal may refer to
Palak Muchhal (born 1992), Indian playback singer 
Palash Muchhal (born 1995), Indian music composer, brother of Palak
Muchhal Mahavir Temple, in Pali district, Rajasthan, India
Muchhal Village , in Amritsar district, Punjab, India